Synthetic immunology is the rational design and construction of synthetic systems that perform complex immunological functions. Functions include using specific cell markers to target cells for destruction and or interfering with immune reactions. US Food and Drug Administration (FDA)-approved immune system modulators include anti-inflammatory and immunosuppressive agents, vaccines, therapeutic antibodies and Toll-like receptor (TLR) agonists.

History 
The discipline emerged after 2010 following the development of genome editing technology including TALENS and CRISPR. In 2015, one project created T cells that became active only in the presence of a specific drug, allowing them to be turned on and off in situ. Another example is a T cell that targets only cells that display two separate markers.

In 2016, John Lin head of Pfizer's San Francisco biotech unit stated, “the immune system will be the most convenient vehicle for [engineered human cells], because they can move and migrate and play such important roles.”

Advances in systems biology support high-dimensional quantitative analysis of immune responses. Techniques include viral gene delivery, inducible gene expression, RNA-guided genome editing, and site-specific recombinases for applications related to biotechnology and cellular immunotherapy.

Types

Immunity-modulating organisms 
Researchers are exploring the creation of 'smart' organisms such as bacteriophages and bacteria that can perform complex immunological tasks. Such strategies could produce organisms that perform multistep immune functions such as presenting antigen to and co-stimulating helper T cells in a specific manner, or providing integrated signals to B cells to induce affinity maturation and isotype switching during antibody production. Such engineered organisms have the potential be as safe and as inexpensive as probiotics but precise in carrying out targeted interventions.

Antibody-recruiting small molecules 
Antibody therapeutics and other 'biologics' have proven to be effective in treating a diseases from rheumatoid arthritis to cancer. However, such agents can cause unwanted anaphylactic or inflammatory reactions, are administered by injection and are expensive. Small molecules, in contrast, are generally inexpensive to produce, orally bioavailable and are rarely allergenic. Synthetic antibody-recruiting small molecules have been created that redirect natural antibodies to pathogens for destruction.

Transdifferentiated cells 
Deletion of a single transcription factor enables mature B cells to transform into T cells via dedifferentiation and redifferentiation. Technologies that can control cell fate include strategies to induce pluripotent stem cell formation and using small molecules to induce stem cells to differentiate into specific cell types. Dedifferentiation could be used to turn autoimmune cells into inactive progenitors or to suppress rejection of transplanted organs.

In 2016 researchers transdifferentiated fibroblasts into induced neural stem cells. The team mixed the cells into an FDA-approved surgical glue that provided a physical support matrix. They administered the result to mice. Survival times increased from 160 to 220 percent, depending on the type of tumor.

Vaccines 
Therapeutic vaccines treat and immunize patients already infected with a given disease. Provenge is an adoptive cell-transfer therapy in which a patient's antigen-presenting target autologous prostate cancer tissue. Advances in chemical biology include synthetic molecules that modulate B cell activation, structurally complex carbohydrate tumor antigen and adjuvants synthesis, immunogenic chemotherapeutic agents and chemically homogeneous, synthetic vaccines.

See also

References

External links 
 
 

Synthetic biology
Immunology